Yancheng District is a district in Kaohsiung City, Taiwan. It is the smallest district in Kaohsiung City. It has been the least populous district of Kaohsiung since 2004. Yancheng District is also an old town of Kaohsiung.

Geography
 Area: 
 Population: 22,538 (January 2023)

Administrative divisions
The district consists of Lanqiao, Ciai, Boai, Shouxing, Zhongshan, Jiaoren, Xinle, Zhongyuan, Guangming, Yuren, Hebin, Shade, Nanduan, Gangdou, Jiangxi, Xinfeng, Fubei, Liuqiao, Lainan, Xinhua and Jiangnan Village.

Government
The representative for Yancheng on the city council is Lee Chiao-Ju.

Tourist attractions
 International Convention Center Kaohsiung
 Kaohsiung City Music Hall
 Kaohsiung Film Archive
 Kaohsiung Museum of History
 Kaohsiung Music Center
 Love Pier
 Love River
 Pier-2 Art Center
 Hamasen Museum of Taiwan Railway
Yanchengpu Night Market

Transportation
The district is accessible from Yanchengpu Station of the Kaohsiung Mass Rapid Transit. Five stations of the Circular light rail, Love Pier, Dayi Pier-2, Penglai Pier-2, Shoushan Park, and Wenwu Temple, serve the district.

Notable natives
 Tiger Huang, singer.
 Yu Chen Yueh-ying, Magistrate of Kaohsiung County (1985-1993)

References

External links

  
 Presentation for the 2012 Most Livable International Cities Contest

Districts of Kaohsiung